The Rosh Pinah mine is a mine near Rosh Pinah in the ǁKaras Region of southern Namibia. It is one of the largest and most important lead and zinc mines in Namibia. The mine is owned by Trevali Mining Corporation since 2017.

History 

German-born Jew Mose Kohan discovered zinc in the nearby Hunz Mountains in 1963. He also coined the name "Rosh Pinah" which is a Hebrew term for "cornerstone". The mine has been in continuous operation since 1969.

Glencore acquired 50.04% ownership of the mine in 2011 and increased its stake shortly thereafter to 80.08%. The remainder of the shares were owned by Black Economic Empowerment (BEE) actors PE Minerals, owned by Aaron Mushimba, Jaguar Investments Four, and a trust representing mine employees.  In June 2014, Glencore announced laying off 124 employees from the Rosh Pinah mine.

In 2017 Glencore sold its majority stake along with other zinc assets to Trevali Mining Corporation for $400 million. In May 2018, Trevali increased its ownership to 90%. In 2020, Trevali Mining Corporation launched a drilling study to consider the expansion of the mining reserve, a project forecasted to cost $93 million.

Minerals
The mine has reserves amounting to 14 million tonnes of ore grading 2% lead and 8% zinc thus resulting 280,000 tonnes of lead and 1.12 million tonnes of zinc. The mine also produces copper, silver and gold as byproducts.

See also 
 Skorpion Zinc
 Mining in Namibia

References 

Lead and zinc mines in Namibia
Buildings and structures in ǁKaras Region
1969 establishments in South West Africa